Copper phosphide, also copper(I) phosphide, cuprous phosphide, cuprophosphorus and phosphor copper, is a compound of copper and phosphorus, a phosphide of copper. It has the appearance of yellowish-grey very brittle mass of crystalline structure. It does not react with water.

Recent crystallographic investigations have proven Cu3P to be copper deficient, which means that the sum formula of this compound is more accurately expressed as Cu3−xP.

Copper phosphide has a role in copper alloys, namely in phosphor bronze. It is a very good deoxidizer of copper.

Copper phosphide can be produced in a reverberatory furnace or in a crucible, e.g. by a reaction of red phosphorus with a copper-rich material. It can also be prepared photochemically, by irradiating cupric hypophosphite with ultraviolet radiation. It can also be produced by reducing copper(II) phosphate with aluminum metal

When subjected to ultraviolet light, copper phosphide shows fluorescence.

A blue-black film of copper phosphide forms on white phosphorus when subjected to a solution of copper salt; wounds containing particles of phosphorus therefore have to be washed with 1% solution of copper sulfate. The particles then can be easily removed, which is helped by their fluorescence.  Formation of protective layer of copper phosphide is also used in cases of phosphorus ingestion, when gastric lavage with copper sulfate is employed as part of the cure.

References

Phosphides
Copper(I) compounds
Deoxidizers